Sokrat Rachevich Jinjolia (Abkhaz: Сократ Аџьынџьал, ; born 11 December 1937) was the second Prime Minister and the second foreign minister of the internationally unrecognised Republic of Abkhazia from 1993 to 1994. He has also been the speaker of the People's Assembly of Abkhazia from 1996 until he lost his seat in the 2002 parliamentary elections to Anatoly Khashba, and was succeeded by Nugzar Ashuba.
He graduated from the Department of Russian Language and Literature Faculty of Philology of Sukhumi Pedagogical Institute. In 1956–1959 he served in the Soviet Army. After transferring to the Army reserve, he worked on Tkvarcheli power plant, and in 1967 was elected secretary to the Tkvarcheli City Council. Between 1985 and 1988 he worked on the Tkvarcheli Party Committee, becoming head of the Department of Agitation and Propaganda. In 1988–1992 – chief editor of "Tkvarchalsky Miner." In 1991, he was elected to the Supreme Council, and in 1992 he became deputy chairman of the Abkhazian armed forces. In 1993 he was appointed Prime Minister. He headed the official delegation from Abkhazia for the peace talks in Geneva. He was elected speaker of the new parliament – the National Assembly – the first and second convocations. He is married. He has two children.
During the 2004 presidential elections, Jinjolia was head of opposition candidate Sergei Bagapsh's election team. He has since become the head of the Sukhumi branch of the Caucasian Institute for Democracy.
Recently, Jinjolia became a member of the newly founded Public Chamber of Abkhazia.

References

1937 births
Living people
People from Tkvarcheli District
Ministers for Foreign Affairs of Abkhazia
Prime Ministers of Abkhazia
1st convocation of the People's Assembly of Abkhazia
2nd convocation of the People's Assembly of Abkhazia